Guimaëc is a commune in the Finistère department of Brittany in north-western France.

Population
Inhabitants of Guimaëc are called in French Guimaëcois.

Breton language
The municipality launched a linguistic plan concerning the Breton language through Ya d'ar brezhoneg on December 22, 2004.

See also
Communes of the Finistère department
List of the works of the Maître de Plougastel

References

External links
Official website 

Mayors of Finistère Association 

Communes of Finistère